Euan Edworthy MBE (born 31 October 1968) is a British public relations consultant and philanthropist based in Prague, the Czech Republic.

Early life

Euan was born in Salisbury, United Kingdom on 31 October 1968. He was educated at Ampleforth College and graduated from the University of Wales, Cardiff, in 1991 with a degree in Politics and History.

Career 
Euan began his PR career at London-based PR company Good Relations in the property planning and development department. In 1993, he became a consultant for Rowland Company in Hong Kong, before moving to Prague in 1994 as an advisor to the Czech government on foreign investment. In 1995, he established Best Communications.

Charitable work 
During his three decades in Prague, Euan has been involved in a number of charitable enterprises.

In 2004, he launched continental Europe's first ever Speakers' Corner, securing a site on Prague's Palackého náměstí central square where demonstrations can be held without a permit. In 2007, he established Speakers’ Corner Trust  – a registered charity which promotes freedom of expression, public debate and active citizenship in the UK and emerging democracies such as the Czech Republic. This trust also worked for the 2009 creation of the Speakers' Corner in Nottingham, England.

In 2014, Euan realised a project, backed by the British expat community in Prague, to build a public memorial dedicated to honouring the Czechoslovak pilots who served in the Royal Air Force (RAF) during World War II. After four months, he had raised £100,000 to fund the project. Euan's father had served in the Royal Air Force, and often told him about the Czechoslovak pilots' bravery. The Winged Lion Memorial (sculpted by British sculptor Colin Spofforth) was unveiled at a ceremony on 17 June 2014, attended by surviving veterans, relatives of the airmen, as well as representatives of the Czech, Slovak and British governments, including dignitaries such as the British Member of Parliament, Rt Hon Sir Nicholas Soames MP, and Air Chief Marshal Sir Stuart Peach.

More money has since been raised to build a plaque on the plinth of the Winged Lion that for the first time lists in one place the names of all 2,507 Czechoslovak airmen who served in the RAF during World War II, with their full ranks and crosses next to the names of those who died in action. Air Chief Marshal Sir Stuart Peach has described it as "a fitting tribute to the bravery of these individuals".

Euan was a Trustee of the Anglo Czech Education Fund for eight years, and was instrumental in establishing the Czech Children of Courage Award and Prague's Red Nose Day Campaign.

Awards and honours 
Euan was appointed Member of the Order of the British Empire (MBE) in the 2020 Birthday Honours for services to UK-Czech Republic relations, under the diplomatic service list.

In recognition of his work honouring the memory of the Czechoslovak RAF pilots, on 11 November 2019 Euan received the Cross of Merit of the Minister of Defence of the Czech Republic. The Cross of Merit is awarded to citizens of foreign nations who have worked in cooperation with the Ministry of Defence of the Czech Republic and engaged in activities in support of the Armed Forces of the Czech Republic.

Personal life 
Euan lives in Prague and is married.

References

1968 births
Living people
People educated at Ampleforth College
British public relations people
Alumni of the University of Wales
British expatriates in the Czech Republic